Hamir Labidah, also spelled Haymar Labidah, Haymar Labdah or Himar Labda, is a village located  south of Manbij in northern Syria. In the 2004 census, it had a population of 3681.

In July 2016, the village was under control of ISIL. It was captured by SDF on 20 August 2016.

References

Aleppo